Eudocima iridescens is a moth of the family Erebidae. It is found in large parts of the world, including Australia, New Zealand and Papua New Guinea.

The wingspan is about 90 mm.

The larvae feed on Menispermaceae species, including Pycnarrhena novoguineensis. It is considered a pest on citrus and other fruit, which it damages by piercing the fruit with its proboscis in order to suck the juice.

External links
http://www-staff.it.uts.edu.au/~don/larvae/cato/iridescens.html 

Eudocima
Moths described in 1894